CHB may refer to:

Caitlin Huey-Burns, political reporter for CBS News
Camp Half-Blood, a camp in Percy Jackson and the Olympians
Central Hawkes Bay
Centre for the History of the Book, University of Edinburgh
Centre half-back in Australian rules football
CHB Bank of South Korea
Champion Homes, NASDAQ symbol CHB
Chang Hwa Bank of Taiwan
Chibcha language (ISO 639-2 and ISO 639-3 codes)
Chilas Airport IATA code
Children's Hospital Boston
Chronic Hepatitis B
Bachelor of Medicine and Surgery ChB
 Chumby Hacker Board
Collegium Hungaricum Berlin (.CHB), the Hungarian Balassi Institute in Berlin
Companion of Honour of Barbados, a class of membership of the defunct Order of Barbados (1980-2021)
Complete Heart Block, a form of atrioventricular block within the heart
Computers in Human Behavior, an academic journal specialized in the use of computers for psychological and education purposes.
Concrete Hollow Block
 Customs House Brokerage